Novoye Gushchino is a rural locality (a village) in Kosinskoye Rural Settlement, Kosinsky District, Perm Krai, Russia. The population was 4 as of 2010. There is 1 street.

Geography 
Novoye Gushchino is located 5 km south of Kosa (the district's administrative centre) by road. Staroye Gushchino is the nearest rural locality.

References 

Rural localities in Kosinsky District